Innocent Momanyi Obiri is a Kenyan politician who is currently a member of the National Assembly for the Bobasi constituency, representing the Peoples Democratic Party.

He attended Aga Khan High School in Mombassa and the University of Nairobi before working as a quantity surveyor prior to entering parliament. He was elected to the National Assembly in the 2017 general election with 37.7% of the vote.

In 2018 he was arrested along with one of his bodyguards on suspicion of causing a disturbance at a quarry. In 2019 he was arrested on suspicion of corruption in relation to the construction of the Lake Basin mall in Kisumu.

Election results

References 

Year of birth missing (living people)
Living people
21st-century Kenyan politicians
Members of the 12th Parliament of Kenya
Members of the 13th Parliament of Kenya
University of Nairobi alumni
Wiper Democratic Movement – Kenya politicians